, the World Checklist of Selected Plant Families and Plants of the World Online recognize about 270 species of Agave plus a number of natural hybrids. This includes species formerly placed in Manfreda and Polianthes. Other sources may use different circumscriptions.

A

Agave abisaii A.Vázquez & Nieves – Mexico (Jalisco)
Agave acicularis Trel. - Cuba
Agave acklinicola Trel. - Bahamas
Agave × ajoensis W.C.Hodgs. - Pima County in Arizona = A. deserti var. simplex × A. schottii var. schottii
Agave aktites Gentry - Mexico (Sinaloa, Sonora)
Agave albescens Trel. - Cuba
Agave alboaustralis (E.Solano & Ríos-Gómez) Thiede - Oaxaca
Agave albomarginata Gentry - northeastern Mexico
Agave albopilosa I.Cabral - Mexico (Nuevo León)
Agave americana L. – American Agave, American Century Plant, Century Plant, Maguey americano - Arizona, Texas, Mexico; naturalized in parts of Africa, Eurasia, Australia, South America various islands
Agave andreae Sahagún & A.Vázquez – Mexico (Michoacán)
Agave angustiarum Trel. - Mexico
Agave angustifolia Haw. - Mexico, Central America; naturalized in Spain, South Africa, Indian Subcontinent, various islands
Agave anomala Trel. - Bahamas, Cuba
Agave antillarum Descourt. - Cuba, Hispaniola
Agave apedicellata Thiede & Eggli – Mexico (Jalisco, San Luis Potosí)
Agave applanata Lem. ex Jacobi - Mexico
Agave arcedianoensis Cházaro - Mexico (Jalisco)
Agave × arizonica Gentry & J.H.Weber = A. chrysantha × A. toumeyana var. bella - Arizona
Agave arubensis Hummelinck - Aruba
Agave asperrima Jacobi – Maguey spero, Rough Century Plant - Texas, Coahuila, Durango, Zacatecas
Agave atrovirens Karw. ex Salm-Dyck - Oaxaca, Puebla, Veracruz
Agave attenuata Salm-Dyck – Swan's Neck Agave, Dragon Tree Agave, Foxtail Agave - Mexico; naturalised in southeastern Australia
Agave aurea Brandegee - Baja California Sur
Agave avellanidens Trel. - Baja California
Agave azurea R.H.Webb & G.D.Starr – Mexico (Baja California Sur)

B

Agave bahamana Trel. - Bahamas
Agave beaulueriana Jacobi = Agave americana var. franzosinii
Agave bicolor (E.Solano & García-Mend.) Thiede & Eggli – Mexico (Oaxaca)
Agave boldinghiana Trel. - Curaçao, Bonaire
*Agave bovicornuta Gentry – Cowhorn Agave - Chihuahua, Sinaloa, Sonora
Agave braceana Trel. - Bahamas (Abaco)
Agave bracteosa S.Watson ex Engelm. – Squid Agave - Mexico (Coahuila, Nuevo León)
Agave brevipetala Trel. - Hispaniola
Agave brevispina Trel. - Hispaniola
Agave brittoniana Trel. - Cuba
Agave brunnea S.Watson – NE. Mexico
Agave bulbulifera (Castillejos & E.Solano) Thiede – Mexico (Guerrero)
Agave bulliana (Baker) Thiede & Eggli - Mexico

C

Agave cacozela Trel. - Bahamas (Eleuthera)
Agave cajalbanensis A.Álvarez - Cuba
†Agave calodonta A.Berger - extinct
Agave cantala (Haw.) Roxb. ex Salm-Dyck – Cantala, Maguey de la India - Mexico, El Salvador, Honduras
Agave capensis Gentry  - Baja California Sur = Agave aurea var. capensis
Agave caribaeicola Trel. - Lesser Antilles
Agave caymanensis Proctor - Cayman Islands
Agave cerulata Trel. - Baja California
Agave chamelensis (E.J.Lott & Verh.-Will.) Thiede & Eggli – Mexico (Jalisco)
Agave chazaroi A.Vázquez & O.M.Valencia - Jalisco
Agave chiapensis Jacobi - Oaxaca, Chiapas, Guatemala
Agave chrysantha Peebles – Golden Flowered Agave, Golden Flower Century Plant - Arizona
Agave chrysoglossa I.M.Johnst. - Baja California, Sonora
Agave cocui Trel. - Colombia, Venezuela (incl Isla Margarita), Aruba, Bonaire, Curaçao
Agave coetocapnia (M.Roem.) Govaerts & Thiede – Mexico
Agave collina Greenm. - Morelos, Guerrero
Agave colorata Gentry – Mescal ceniza - Sinaloa, Sonora
Agave confertiflora Thiede & Eggli – Mexico (Chihuahua)
Agave congesta Gentry - Chiapas
Agave convallis Trel. - Oaxaca
Agave cremnophila - Oaxaca
Agave cundinamarcensis A.Berger - Colombia
Agave cupreata Trel. & A.Berger - Guerrero, Michoacán

D

Agave dasylirioides Jacobi & C.D.Bouché - Morelos, México State
Agave datylio F.A.C.Weber - Baja California Sur
Agave debilis A.Berger – C. & SW. Mexico (to Hidalgo)
Agave decipiens Baker – False Sisal - Florida; naturalised in parts of Africa
Agave delamateri W.C.Hodgs. & Slauson - Arizona
Agave demeesteriana Jacobi - Sinaloa, Veracruz
Agave deserti Engelm. – Desert Century Plant, Desert Agave, Maguey de Desierto - Baja California, California, Arizona
Agave difformis A.Berger - Hidalgo, San Luis Potosí
Agave doctorensis L.Hern. & Magallán – Mexico (Querétaro)
Agave dolichantha Thiede & Eggli – Mexico (Jalisco, Michoacán)
Agave durangensis Gentry - Durango, Zacatecas
Agave dussiana Trel. - Lesser Antilles

E
Agave eggersiana Trel. – Eggers' Century Plant, St. Croix Agave - US Virgin Islands (St. Croix, St. Thomas)
Agave ehrenbergii Jacobi - Cuba = Agave mitis Mart.
Agave ellemeetiana Jacobi – Mexico (Veracruz, Oaxaca)
Agave ensifera Jacobi
Agave evadens Trel. - Trinidad, Venezuelan Antilles (Isla Margarita)

F
Agave felgeri Gentry – Mescalito - Sonora
Agave filifera Salm-Dyck – Thread-leaf Agave - Querétaro to México State, Aguascalientes, Hidalgo, San Luis Potosí
Agave flexispina Trel. - Chihuahua, Durango
Agave fortiflora Gentry - Sonora
Agave fourcroydes Lem. – Henequen, Maguey Henequen, Mexican Sisal - Mexico, Guatemala; naturalized in West Indies, Italy, Canary Islands
Agave funkiana K.Koch & C.D.Bouché – Ixtle de Jaumav - Mexico (Tamaulipas to Chiapas)
Agave fusca (Ravenna) Thiede & Eggli – Guatemala

G

Agave galvaniae (A.Castañeda – Mexico (México State)
Agave garciae-mendozae Galván & L.Hern. - Hidalgo
Agave geminiflora (Tagl.) Ker Gawl. - Nayarit
Agave gentryi B.Ullrich - Nuevo León, Querétaro
Agave ghiesbreghtii Lem. ex Jacobi - Mexico, Guatemala
Agave gigantensis Gentry - Sierra de la Giganta in Baja California Sur
Agave gilbertii A.Berger - Mexico
Agave × glomeruliflora (Engelm.) A.Berger = A. havardiana × A. lechuguilla - Coahuila, western Texas
Agave gomezpompae Cházaro & Jimeno-Sevilla - Veracruz
Agave gracielae Galvan & Zamudio – Mexico (Querétaro)
Agave gracilipes Trel. – Maguey de pastizal, Slimfoot Century Plant - Chihuahua, southern New Mexico, western Texas
Agave gracillima A.Berger – Mexico (Durango, Jalisco, Nayarit)
Agave graminifolia (Rose) Govaerts & Thiede – NE. Mexico (to Jalisco)
Agave grisea Trel. - Cuba
Agave guadalajarana Trel. – Maguey chato - Jalisco, Nayarit
Agave guerrerensis (Matuda) G.D.Rowley – Mexico (Guerrero)
Agave guiengola Gentry - Oaxaca
Agave guttata Jacobi & C.D.Bouché – NE. Mexico (to Jalisco)
Agave gypsophila Gentry - Colima, Guerrero, Jalisco

H
Agave harrisii Trel. - Jamaica
Agave hauniensis J.B.Petersen – C. Mexico (to Guerrero)
Agave havardiana Trel. – Havard's Century Plant, Chisos Agave, Maguey de Havard - Chihuahua, Coahuila, Texas
Agave hiemiflora Gentry - Chiapas, Guatemala
Agave hookeri Jacobi - Jalisco, Michoacán
Agave horrida Lem. ex Jacobi - Morelos, Veracruz, Oaxaca
Agave howardii (Verh.-Will.) Thiede & Eggli – Mexico (Jalisco, Colima)
Agave hurteri Trel. - Guatemala

I–J
Agave impressa Gentry - Sinaloa
Agave inaequidens K.Koch - Mexico
Agave inaguensis Trel. - Bahamas (Inagua), Turks & Caicos Islands
Agave indagatorum Trel. - Bahamas (Watling Island)
Agave intermixta Trel. - Haiti
Agave involuta (McVaugh) Thiede & Eggli – Mexico (S. Zacatecas, SE. Nayarit, Jalisco)
Agave isthmensis A.García-Mend. & F.Palma - Oaxaca, Chiapas
Agave jaiboli Gentry - Sonora, Chihuahua
Agave jaliscana (Rose) A.Berger – W. Mexico (to Durango)
Agave jarucoensis A.Álvarez - Cuba
Agave jimenoi Cházaro & A.Vázquez – Mexico (Veracruz)
Agave justosierrana (García-Mend.) Thiede – Mexico (Guerrero)

K–L

Agave karatto Mill. - Lesser Antilles, Netherlands Antilles
Agave karwinskii Zucc. - Oaxaca, Puebla
Agave kavandivi García-Mend. & C.Chávez – Mexico (Oaxaca)
Agave kerchovei Lem. - Hidalgo, Oaxaca, Puebla
Agave kewensis Jacobi - Chiapas
Agave kristenii A.Vázquez & Cházaro – Mexico (Michoacán)
Agave lagunae Trel. - Guatemala (Amatitlan)
Agave lechuguilla Torr. – Agave lecheguilla, Lecheguilla, Lechuguilla, Maguey lechuguilla - northern Mexico, New Mexico, Texas
Agave × leopoldii W.Watson – AGM
Agave littoralis (García-Mend. – Mexico (Guerrero, Oaxaca)
Agave longibracteata (Verh.-Will.) Thiede & Eggli – Mexico (Michoacán)
Agave longiflora (Rose) G.D.Rowley – S. Texas to Mexico (Tamaulipas, Nuebo León)
Agave longipes Trel. - Jamaica

M
Agave macroacantha Zucc. - Puebla, Oaxaca
Agave maculata Regel – S. Texas to NE. Mexico
Agave madrensis Villarreal – Mexico (Nuevo León)
Agave manantlanicola Cuevas & Santana-Michel - Jalisco
Agave mapisaga Trel. - Mexico
Agave margaritae Brandegee - Baja California Sur
Agave maria-patriciae Cházaro & Arzaba – Mexico (Veracruz)
Agave marmorata Roezl - Puebla, Oaxaca
Agave maximiliana Baker - Mexico
Agave mckelveyana Gentry – Mckelvey Agave, McKelvey's Century Plant - Arizona (Yavapai + Mohave Cos)
Agave melanacantha Lem. ex Jacobi – C. Cuba
Agave michoacana (M.Cedano – Mexico (Michoacán)
Agave microceps (Kimnach) A.Vázquez & Cházaro - Sinaloa
Agave millspaughii Trel. - Bahamas (Exuma)

Agave minor Proctor - Puerto Rico
Agave missionum Trel. – Corita - Puerto Rico, U.S. Virgin Islands
Agave mitis Mart. - Hidalgo
Agave montana Villarreal - Nuevo León
Agave montium-sancticaroli García-Mend. - Tamaulipas
Agave moranii Gentry - Baja California
Agave multicolor (E.Solano & Dávila) Thiede – Mexico (Guanajuato)
Agave multifilifera Gentry - Chihuahua, Durango, Sinaloa
Agave murpheyi Gibson – Maguey Bandeado, Murphey Agave, Murphey's Century Plant, Hohokam Agave - Arizona, Sonora

N
Agave nanchititlensis (Matuda) ined. – Mexico (México State)
Agave nashii Trel. - Bahamas (Inagua)
Agave nayaritensis Gentry - Sinaloa, Nayarit
Agave neglecta Small – wild century plant = Agave weberi
Agave neocernua Thiede - Jalisco
Agave neonelsonii Thiede & Eggli – Mexico (Durango)
Agave neopringlei Thiede & Eggli – Mexico
Agave nickelsiae Rol.-Goss. - Coahuila
Agave nizandensis Cutak – Dwarf Octopus Agave - Oaxaca
Agave nuusaviorum García-Mend. - Oaxaca

O
Agave oaxacana (García-Mend. & E.Solano) Thiede – Mexico (Oaxaca)
Agave obscura Schiede ex Schltdl. - Mexico 
Agave ocahui Gentry - Sonora
Agave offoyana De Smet ex Jacobi – Cuba (Villa Clara)
Agave ornithobroma Gentry – Maguey pajarito - Nayarit, Sinaloa
Agave oroensis Gentry - Zacatecas
Agave ortgiesiana (Baker) Trel. in L.H.Bailey - Colima, Jalisco
Agave oteroi G.D. Starr & T.J. Davis - Oaxaca
Agave ovatifolia G.D.Starr & Villarreal - Nuevo León

P–Q
Agave pablocarrilloi A.Vázquez – Mexico (Colima)
Agave pachycentra Trel. - Chiapas, Guatemala, El Salvador, Honduras
Agave palmeri Engelm. – Maguey de tlalcoyote, Palmer Agave, Palmer Century Plant, Palmer's Century Plant - Sonora, Chihuahua, Arizona, New Mexico 
Agave palustris (Rose) Thiede & Eggli – Mexico (Durango, Nayarit)
Agave panamana Trel. – Panama

Agave paniculata (L.Hern. – Mexico (Yucatán)
Agave papyrocarpa Trel. - Cuba (Isla de la Juventud)
Agave parrasana A.Berger - Coahuila
Agave parryi Engelm. – Mezcal yapavai, Parry Agave, Parry's Agave - Chihuahua, Durango, Guanajuato, Arizona, New Mexico, Texas
Agave parva (Aarón Rodr.) Thiede – Mexico (Guerrero)
Agave parvidentata Trel. - El Salvador, Honduras
Agave parviflora Torr. in W.H.Emory – Maguey sbari, Smallflower Agave, Smallflower Century Plant, Little Princess Agave - Arizona, Sonora, Chihuahua
Agave pax Gir.-Cañas - Colombia
Agave peacockii Croucher - Puebla, Oaxaca
Agave pelona Gentry – Bald Agave - Sonora
Agave pendula Schnittsp.  - Chiapas, Veracruz, Guatemala
Agave petiolata Trel. - Curaçao
Agave petrophila A.García-Mend. & E.Martínez - Puebla, Oaxaca, Guerrero
Agave petskinil (R.A.Orellana – Mexico (Yucatán)
Agave phillipsiana W.C.Hodgs. - Arizona (Coconino Co)
Agave pintilla S.González - Durango
Agave planifolia S.Watson – Mexico (Sonora, Chihuahua)
Agave platyphylla (Rose) Thiede & Eggli – Mexico (Durango, Zacatecas, Jalisco)
Agave polianthes Thiede & Eggli – C. & S. Mexico
Agave polianthiflora Gentry - Chihuahua, Sonora
Agave polyacantha Haw. - Oaxaca, San Luis Potosí, Tamaulipas, Veracruz
Agave potatorum Zucc. – Drunkard Agave - Puebla, Oaxaca
Agave potosina B.L.Rob. & Greenm. – NE. Mexico
Agave potreriana Trel. - Mexico
Agave pratensis A.Berger – Mexico (Jalisco, Nayarit)
Agave pringlei Engelm. ex Baker – Mexico (N. Baja California)
Agave producta Thiede & Eggli – Mexico (Guerrero)
Agave promontorii Trel. - Baja California Sur
Agave pubescens Regel & Ortgies – Mexico (Morelos, Oaxaca, Chiapas)
Agave × pumila De Smet ex Baker = A. asperrima × A. nickelsiae - Coahuila

Agave quilae (Art.Castro & Aarón Rodr.) Thiede & Govaerts - Mexico (Jalisco)

R
Agave revoluta Klotzsch – Mexico (México State)
Agave rhodacantha Trel. - Mexico
Agave rosei Thiede & Eggli – Mexico (Nayarit)
Agave rovelliana Tod. - Texas
Agave rutteniae Hummelinck - Aruba
Agave rzedowskiana P.Carrillo - Sinaloa, Jalisco

S

Agave salmiana Otto ex Salm-Dyck – Pulque, Maguey, Maguey de montaña - Mexico; naturalized in South Africa, Canary Islands
Agave scabra Ortega – Mexico to Nicaragua
Agave scaposa Gentry - Oaxaca, Puebla
Agave schidigera Lem. - northern + central Mexico
Agave schneideriana A.Berger - Puebla
Agave schottii Engelm. – Maguey puercoesp n, Schott Agave, Schott's Century Plant, Shindagger, Leather Agave - Sonora, Arizona, New Mexico
Agave sebastiana Greene - Baja California
Agave seemanniana Jacobi - Oaxaca, Chiapas, Costa Rica, Nicaragua, Guatemala, Honduras
Agave shaferi Trel. - Cuba 
Agave shawii Engelm. – Coastal Agave, Maguey primavera - Baja California, California (San Diego Co)
Agave shrevei Gentry - Chihuahua, Sonora
Agave sileri (Verh.-Will.) Thiede & Eggli – SC. Texas to Mexico (Tamaulipas)
Agave singuliflora (S.Watson) A.Berger – N. Mexico
Agave sisalana Perrine – Maguey de Sisal, Sisal, Sisal Hemp - Chiapas; widely cultivated for fiber; naturalized in Spain, Ecuador, Brazil, Queensland, Central America, parts of Asia + Africa, various islands
Agave sobolifera Houtt. - Cuba, Jamaica
Agave sobria Brandegee - Baja California Sur
Agave spicata Cav. - Hidalgo
Agave stictata Thiede & Eggli – Mexico (México State, Guerrero, Oaxaca)
Agave striata Zucc. - northeastern Mexico
Agave stricta Salm-Dyck - Oaxaca, Puebla
Agave stringens Trel. - Jalisco
Agave subsimplex Trel. - Sonora

T

Agave tecta Trel. - Guatemala
Agave temacapulinensis A.Vázquez & Cházaro – Mexico (Jalisco)
Agave tenuifolia Zamudio & E.Sánchez - Querétaro
Agave tequilana F.A.C.Weber – Mezcal azul tequilero, Tequila Agave, Weber Blue Agave - Mexico
Agave thomasiae Trel. - Guatemala
Agave titanota Gentry - Puebla, Oaxaca
Agave toumeyana Trel. – Toumey Agave, Toumey's Century Plant - Arizona
Agave triangularis Jacobi - Puebla, Oaxaca
Agave tubulata Trel. - Cuba
Agave turneri R.H.Webb & Salazar-Ceseña - Baja California

U–V

Agave umbrophila (García-Mend.) Thiede – Mexico (Guerrero, Oaxaca)
Agave underwoodii Trel. - Cuba
Agave undulata Klotzsch – Mexico (Tamaulipas)
Agave univittata Haw. - Mexico, Texas
Agave utahensis Engelm. in S.Watson – Utah Agave - Utah, Nevada, California, Arizona
Agave valenciana Cházaro & A.Vázquez - Jalisco
Agave variegata Jacobi – S. Texas to Mexico
Agave vazquezgarciae Cházaro & J.A.Lomelí - Jalisco
Agave vera-cruz Mill. - Veracruz, Oaxaca; naturalized in Indian Subcontinent, Thailand, various islands
Agave verdensis W.C.Hodgs. & Salywon – Arizona
Agave verhoekiae (García-Mend.) Thiede – Mexico (Oaxaca)
Agave vicina Trel. - Netherlands Antilles, Venezuelan Antilles
Agave victoriae-reginae T.Moore – Queen Victoria's Agave - Coahuila, Nuevo Leon, Durango
Agave vilmoriniana A.Berger – Octopus Agave - Mexico
Agave virginica L. – C. & E. U.S.A. to NE. Mexico
Agave vivipara L. - Netherlands Antilles, Venezuelan Antilles; naturalised in parts of Australia + Africa
Agave vizcainoensis Gentry - Baja California Sur

W–Z
Agave wallisii Jacobi - Colombia
Agave warelliana Baker - Veracruz, Oaxaca, Chiapas
Agave weberi J.F.Cels ex J.Poiss. – Maguey liso, Weber's Century Plant, Weber Agave - San Luis Potosí, Tamaulipas; naturalized in southern Texas
Agave wercklei F.A.C.Weber ex Wercklé - Costa Rica; naturalised in parts of Africa
Agave wildingii Tod. - Cuba
Agave wocomahi Gentry - Sonora, Chihuahua, Durango, Sinaloa, Jalisco
Agave xylonacantha Salm-Dyck – Century Plant, Maguey diente de tiburn - Hidalgo, San Luis Potosi
Agave yavapaiensis W.C.Hodgs. & Salywon – Arizona
Agave zapopanensis (E.Solano & Ríos-Gómez) Thiede – Mexico (Jalisco)
Agave zebra Gentry - Sonora

Formerly included
Manfreda and Polianthes species are included in Agave.

References

Agave
Agave